MHC Dynamo Moscow is a Russian junior ice hockey team based in Moscow that currently plays in the Junior Hockey League. The team was founded in 2009 as "Sheriff" and adopted the name "MHC MVD" in 2011 before changing it to their current name in 2017. They are the junior affiliate of HC Dynamo Moscow of the Kontinental Hockey League (KHL) and play their home games in Balashikha Arena.

External links
Official Website

2009 establishments in Russia
Ice hockey teams in Russia
Dynamo sports society
HC MVD
Junior Hockey League (Russia) teams
Ice hockey clubs established in 2009